The men's 400 metres hurdles competition at the 2018 Asian Games took place on 26 and 27 August 2018 at the Gelora Bung Karno Stadium.

Schedule
All times are Western Indonesia Time (UTC+07:00)

Records

Results
Legend
DNF — Did not finish
DNS — Did not start

Round 1
 Qualification: First 2 in each heat (Q) and the next 2 fastest (q) advance to the final.

Heat 1

Heat 2

Heat 3

Final

References

External links
Results

Hurdles 400 men
2018 men